(born June 25, 1972) is a Japanese semi-retired professional mixed martial artist and former K-1 kickboxer and PRIDE FC fighter  who has defeated the likes of Don Frye, Choi Mu-Bae, Jim York, Wesley Correira and Edson Draggo. Nakao is a World Victory Road veteran and signed a contract with DREAM in 2011 before the promotion closed in mid-2012. Nakao lost to Antônio Silva at World Victory Road Presents: Sengoku Rebellion 2009 after suffering an ACL injury as a result of a leg kick from Silva in the first round. Nakao most recently fought Dave Herman at Sengoku: Soul of Fight, losing by unanimous decision. In 2012 Nakao has decided to briefly retire from mixed martial arts to let some of his recent injuries heal and focus on family more. Nakao earned the nickname "kiss" after he infamously kissed Heath Herring on the lips and was subsequently knocked out by Herring before their fight even began at K-1 PREMIUM 2005 Dynamite!!.

New Year's Eve kiss
On December 31, 2005, Nakao was involved in a memorable MMA moment during K-1's Dynamite 2005 show.

During the pre-fight staredown with opponent Heath Herring, Nakao leaned in and kissed him on the lips. Herring reacted, delivering a right hook to the jaw of Nakao, knocking him out cold. Herring was immediately disqualified and Nakao was carried from the ring. Shortly thereafter, Nakao's cornermen attacked Herring and a brief melee ensued.

The fight result has since been changed by K-1 from a disqualification loss for Herring to a no contest, as K-1 judges ruled that Nakao's kiss and Herring's subsequent knockout punch were both fouls.

Mixed martial arts record

|-
| Loss
| align=center| 9–3 (2)
| Dave Herman
| Decision (unanimous)
| World Victory Road Presents: Soul of Fight
| 
| align=center| 3
| align=center| 5:00
| Tokyo, Japan
| 
|-
| Win
| align=center| 9–2 (2)
| Henry Miller
| TKO (punches)
| World Victory Road Presents: Sengoku Raiden Championships 12
| 
| align=center| 2
| align=center| 3:27
| Tokyo, Japan
| 
|-
| Win
| align=center| 8–2 (2)
| Choi Mu-Bae
| Decision (unanimous)
| World Victory Road Presents: Sengoku 9
| 
| align=center| 3
| align=center| 5:00
| Saitama, Saitama, Japan
| 
|-
| Loss
| align=center| 7–2 (2)
| SilvaAntônio Silva
| TKO (knee injury)
| World Victory Road Presents: Sengoku no Ran 2009
| 
| align=center| 1
| align=center| 1:42
| Saitama, Saitama, Japan
| 
|-
| Win
| align=center| 7–1 (2)
| YorkJim York
| KO (punches)
| World Victory Road Presents: Sengoku 2
| 
| align=center| 2
| align=center| 0:46
| Tokyo, Japan
| 
|-
| Win
| align=center| 6–1 (2)
| VieiraEdson Claas Vieira
| Submission (neck crank)
| PRIDE 34
| 
| align=center| 1
| align=center| 9:51
| Tokyo, Japan
| 
|-
| Loss
| align=center| 5–1 (2)
| Kazuhiro Nakamura
| Decision (unanimous)
| Pride FC - Final Conflict Absolute
| 
| align=center| 3
| align=center| 5:00
| Saitama, Saitama, Japan
| 
|-
| Win
| align=center| 5–0 (2)
| LeeLee Eun-Soo
| TKO (doctor stoppage) 
| Pride FC - Critical Countdown Absolute
| 
| align=center| 1
| align=center| 4:16
| Tokyo, Japan
| 
|-
| NC
| align=center| 4–0 (2)
| HerringHeath Herring
| No Contest
| K-1 Premium 2005 Dynamite
| 
| align=center| 1
| align=center| 0:00
| Saitama, Saitama, Japan
| Nakao kissed Herring during the pre-match stare-down, after which Herring knocked him out with a punch rendering him unable to continue. Originally ruled a DQ and overturned to a NC.
|-
| Win
| align=center| 4–0 (1)
| FalamoeFai Falamoe
| Submission (armbar) 
| Hero's 3
| 
| align=center| 1
| align=center| 2:35
| Tokyo, Japan
| 
|-
| Win
| align=center| 3–0 (1)
| FryeDon Frye
| Decision (unanimous)
| K-1 Premium 2004 Dynamite
| 
| align=center| 3
| align=center| 5:00
| Tokyo, Japan
| 
|-
| Win
| align=center| 2–0 (1)
| CorreiraWesley Correira
| Decision (split)
| K-1 Rumble on the Rock 2004
| 
| align=center| 3
| align=center| 5:00
| Honolulu, Hawaii, United States
| 
|-
| NC
| align=center| 1–0 (1)
| FryeDon Frye
| No Contest (accidental headbutt)
| K-1 MMA ROMANEX
| 
| align=center| 1
| align=center| 0:00
| Saitama, Saitama, Japan
| 
|-
| Win
| align=center| 1–0
| KhakhaleishviliDavid Khakhaleishvili
| KO (punches)
| K-1
| 
| align=center| 2
| align=center| 1:13
| Nagoya, Japan
|

K-1 kickboxing record

References

External links

Living people
Sportspeople from Tokyo
Japanese male mixed martial artists
Heavyweight mixed martial artists
Mixed martial artists utilizing kickboxing
Mixed martial artists utilizing wrestling
Japanese male kickboxers
Heavyweight kickboxers
1972 births
Japanese male sport wrestlers
Japanese male professional wrestlers
Wrestlers at the 2002 Asian Games
Japan Ground Self-Defense Force personnel
Asian Games competitors for Japan